Siquijor, officially the Province of Siquijor, is an island province in the Philippines located in the Central Visayas region. Its capital is the municipality also named Siquijor. To the north of Siquijor is Cebu, to the west is Negros, northeast is Bohol, and to the south, across the Bohol Sea, is Mindanao.

During the Spanish colonial period of the Philippines, the Spaniards called the island  (Island of Fire). Siquijor is commonly associated with mystic traditions that the island's growing tourism industry capitalizes on.

History

Creation of the island
A Siquijor legend tells of a great storm which once engulfed the region. Then there came a strong earthquake that shook the earth and sea. Amidst the lightning and thunder arose an island from the depths of the ocean's womb which came to be known as the island. Despite being a legend, modern times highland farmers have unraveled giant shell casings under farm plots, supporting the theory that Siquijor is indeed an island that rose from the sea.

Precolonial Era

Prior to colonization, the island polity was home to the Kingdom (Kedatuan) of Katugasan, from tugas, the molave trees that cover the hills, which abounded the island along with fireflies.
The tugas or molave trees were used by the ancient dwellers of the island in making posts or haligi of their houses because of its strength and durability that could withstand and struggle against strong typhoons and habagat and was proven by the house of Totang built near the artesian well of Cang-igdot. Most of the patriarchs of the island made the tugas trees to a wooden plow or tukod to cultivate the rocky soil for farming using mainly toro or male cattle to pull it through the sticky and hard rocky soil. However, before the discovery of making tugas as the foundations of their house, the primitive Siquijodnons dwelt in the caves as evidenced by the pottery and old tools like stone grinder or liligsan excavated by Mitring from the three caves of Sam-ang.
During this time, the people of the kingdom was already in contact with Chinese traders, as seen through archaeological evidence including Chinese ceramics and other objects. The art of traditional healing and traditional witchcraft belief systems also developed within this period. During the arrival of the Spanish, the monarch of the island was Datu Kihod, as recorded in Legazpi's chronicles.

Spanish era

The island was first sighted by the Spaniards in 1565 during Miguel López de Legazpi's expedition. The Spaniards called the island  ("Island of Fire"), because the island gave off an eerie glow, from the great swarms of fireflies that lived in the numerous molave trees on the island. Esteban Rodríguez of the Legazpi expedition led the first Spaniards to discover the island. He was captain of a small party that left Legazpi's camp in Bohol to explore the nearby islands which are now called Pamilican, Siquijor, and Negros.

The island, along with the rest of the archipelago, was subsequently annexed to the Spanish Empire. Founded in 1783 under the administration of secular clergymen, Siquijor became the first municipality as well as the first parish to be established on the island. Siquijor was, from the beginning, administered by the Diocese of Cebu. As for civil administration, Siquijor was under Bohol since the province had its own governor. The first Augustinian Recollect priest arrived in Siquijor in 1794. Several years later, a priest of the same order founded the parishes of Larena (initially called ), Lazi (formerly Tigbawan), San Juan (Makalipay), and Maria. With the exception of Enrique Villanueva, the other five municipalities were established as parishes in 1877. From 1854 to 1892, Siquijor was administered by the politico-military province of Bohol. Later in 1892, it was transferred to Negros Oriental and became its sub-province in 1901.

American rule and World War II

At the turn of the century, Spain ceded the Philippines to the United States of America with the Treaty of Paris that ended the Spanish–American War. Siquijor island felt the presence of American rule when a unit of the American Cavalry Division came and stayed for sometime. The American Military Governor in Manila appointed James Fugate, a scout with the California Volunteers of the U.S. Infantry, to oversee and to implement the organization and development programs in Siquijor Island. Governor Fugate stayed for 16 years as lieutenant governor of Siquijor.

While it was not at the center of military action, Siquijor was not spared by World War II. Imperial Japanese detachments occupied the island between 1942 and 1943, announcing their arrival on the island with heavy shelling. At the outbreak of the war, Siquijor was a sub-province of Negros Oriental, headed by Lieutenant Governor Nicolas Parami. Refusing to pledge allegiance to the Japanese forces, Lt. Governor Parami was taken by Japanese soldiers from his residence at Poo, Lazi one evening and brought to the military headquarters in Larena. He was never heard from again. On November 10, 1942, Japanese warships started shelling Lazi from Cangabas Point. In Lazi, a garrison was established in the old Home Economics Building of the Central School. Filipino guerrillas engaged in sabotage and the interaction during this time caused havoc on the Japanese lives and properties.

During this period, Siquijor was briefly governed by Shunzo Suzuki, a Japanese civilian appointed by the Japanese forces until he was assassinated in October 1942 by the guerrilla forces led by Iluminado Jumawanin, of Caipilan, Siquijor. Mamor Fukuda took control of Siquijor from June 1943 until the Japanese forces abandoned the island when the liberation forces came in 1944. In 1943, the Japanese puppet government appointed Sebastian Monera of San Juan as Governor of Siquijor. His administration, however, was cut short when he was executed, presumably by Filipino guerrillas operating in the mountains of Siquijor.

On September 30, 1943, the United States submarine USS Bowfin (SS-287) delivered supplies to the people of Siquijor and evacuated people from the island.

On February 21, 1945, the destroyer USS Renshaw (DD-499), part of Task Unit 78.7.6, was escorting a convoy of about 50 various landing ships with 12 other escorts.  At 10:59, Renshaw was attacked by a Japanese midget submarine off the coast of Siquijor, which caused extensive damage to the ship and killed 19 of the crew.

In mid-1945, local Filipino soldiers and officers under the 7th, 75th and 76th Infantry Division of the Philippine Commonwealth Army arrived, and alongside recognized guerrilla fighter groups, liberated Siquijor.

After 1945

For a time Siquijor was a subprovince of Negros Oriental, but it became an independent province on September 17, 1971, by virtue of Republic Act 6398. The move was supported by the people of Siquijor as they have a distinct culture from those of Negros Oriental, while Marcos used the movement as a means to secure support from the people of the island to pave martial law acceptance the following year. The capital, formerly Larena, was transferred to the municipality of Siquijor in 1972 by Proclamation No. 1075, under martial law.

In 2006, the Lazi Church was added by the government as an extension to the Baroque Churches of the Philippines UNESCO World Heritage Site. The inscription of the church has been pending since.

Geography

Siquijor is an island province in Central Visayas. It lies southeast from Cebu and Negros across Cebu Strait (also called Bohol Strait) and southwest from Bohol. Panglao Island, which is part of Bohol province, has a similar composition of the soil which is found throughout the whole island of Siquijor.

Topography

It is predominantly hilly and in many places the hills reach the sea, producing precipitous cliffs. Three marine terraces can be roughly traced especially in the vicinity of Tagibo on the southwestern part of the island, a barrio of San Juan municipality from the seacoast up into the central part.

Siquijor is a coralline island, and fossils of the giant clam tridacna are often encountered in the plowed inland fields. On the hilltops there are numerous shells of the molluscan species presently living in the seas around the island. Siquijor was probably formed quite recently, geologically speaking.

Climate

Siquijor has two different climates, dominated by Am.  All climate is within Coronas climate type IV, characterised by not very pronounced maximum rainfall with a short dry season from one to three months and a wet season of nine to ten months. The dry season starts in February and lasts through April sometimes extending to midMay.

Five of the municipalities have significant rainfall most months of the year, with a short dry season that has little effect. This location is classified as Am (tropical monsoon climate) by Köppen–Geiger climate classification system. The precipitation about varies  between the driest month and the wettest month, with the average rainfall  or less.

The municipality Lazi has a significant amount of rainfall during the year. This is true even for the driest month. According to Köppen and Geiger, this climate is classified as Af (tropical rainforest climate).

Administrative division
Siquijor (province) comprises 6 municipalities. Siquijor (municipality) is the capital and most important port.

 18th Congress of the Philippines
The Lone district of Siquijor is the representation of the province in various national legislatures. The current representative is Jake Vincent S. Villa.

Demographics

According to the 2015 census, it has a population of 95,984.

Languages
The main language spoken in the island province is Cebuano, with Tagalog and English often used as second languages. The former is understood and used as the national lingua franca, but it is rarely used in everyday conversation among locals.

Religion

95% of the island's residents belong to the Catholic Church, while the remainder belong to various other Christian churches. Despite the province's Catholic affinities, almost all of the residents continue to adhere to traditional practices that were used prior the 15th century, albeit these practices have also adopted Christian belief systems as well. Due to the ingrained and indispensable traditional belief systems, majority of residents have continued to possess a high respect for the natural environment which was revered by the ancestors of the people. Siquijor is known for its unique Philippine culture of blending Catholicism with traditional religious practices – a major part of its people's cultural heritage and identity.

Education

The literacy rate of 92.5% is one of the highest in the country. The Siquijor State College located in Larena is the only state college in the province.

Economy

Tourism

Siquijor's long-time reputation as a place of magic and sorcery both attracts and repulses visitors. Siquijor is also well known for its festivals that focus on healing rituals where incantations are sung while the old folks make potions out of herbs, roots, insects and tree barks.

Among the many attractions are the beaches, caves, waterfalls, Bandilaa natural park and butterfly sanctuary. The most popular of them are the Cambugahay Falls, Paliton Beach and the centuries-old Balete tree, both located in Lazi.

The coral reefs ringing the island offer some of the best diving in the Philippines for snorkelers and scuba divers. Dive courses are conducted by several dive operators on the island in version of PADI, CMAS* and NAUI. Siquijor was declared a marine visitor arrivals among the three provinces in Region VII.

Transportation

The island of Siquijor has two seaports capable of servicing cargo and passenger sea crafts. Siquijor also has an airfield located near Siquijor capable of handling smaller and mostly  airplanes.

Gallery

Notable personalities

Datu Kihod - the last reigning monarch of the Kingdom of Katugasan, who reigned during the 16th century

See also
 Provinces of the Philippines

Notes

References

Sources

External links

 
 Siquijor island - information

 
Provinces of the Philippines
Provinces of Central Visayas
Island provinces of the Philippines
States and territories established in 1971
1971 establishments in the Philippines
Bohol Sea
Former sub-provinces of the Philippines